Ruslan Smelyansky (born 1950) is a Russian mathematician, Dr. Sc., Professor, a professor at the Faculty of Computer Science at the Moscow State University, Corresponding Member of the Russian Academy of Sciences.

He defended the thesis «Analysis of the performance of multiprocessor systems based on the invariant behavior of programs» for the degree of Doctor of Physical and Mathematical Sciences (1990). He is the author of six books.

References

Bibliography

External links
 Annals of the Moscow University
 MSU CMC
 Scientific works of Ruslan Smelyansky
 Scientific works of Ruslan Smelyansky

Russian computer scientists
Russian mathematicians
Living people
Academic staff of Moscow State University
1950 births
Moscow State University alumni